Gymnocypris przewalskii (common name: Przewalskii's naked carp; in ) is a species of cyprinid that is endemic to the Lake Qinghai basin in China, where it is the dominant fish species (the other natives are four Triplophysa loaches). G. przewalskii is a planktivore with a main population that migrates from the lake to rivers to spawn and another that lives its entire life in the nearby Ganzi River. The species is listed as endangered on the China Species Red List due to overfishing and habitat loss, which has led to suspension of its commercial fishery four times since 1989.

Named in honor of geographer and explorer Nikolai Przhevalsky (also spelled Przewalski and Prjevalsky, 1839-1888), who collected the type species and in whose book about Mongolia Kessler’s description appeared.

Characteristics 

They have long, flat bodies and almost no scales except near the anus and shoulder girdle, which gives them their common name. They grow relatively slowly and may take 7–10 years to reach reproductive size.

Migration 

The Qinghai Lake has a salinity of about 14 parts per thousand, meaning that the water is brackish. From April to July adults of the lake population migrate  to nearby freshwater streams to spawn. These include the Harge, Goncha, Chang Ji, and Buha rivers.  Much like salmon, they seek sandy gravel banks with slower currents to build nests. When fish return to the lake, their electrolyte levels increase quickly to concentrations similar to Lake Qinghai's salinity, while urine flow, metabolic rate, and oxygen consumption all decrease drastically. This is thought to represent the reduced osmoregulatory and metabolic costs of living in Lake Qinghai which make returning after spawning and reproduction advantageous. Young fish are thought to return to the lake after overwintering in their spawning streams.

The other population spends its entire life in the nearby Ganzi River and is variously recognized as a separate ecotype or subspecies (G. p. ganzihonensis). Although likely connected to Lake Qinghai in historical times, the low water levels have separated them, effectively isolating the naked barb in this river. The two populations differ in shape and number of gill rakers.

References 

Gymnocypris
Taxa named by Karl Kessler
Freshwater fish of China
Endemic fauna of China
Fish described in 1876